Macky is both a given name and a surname. It may refer to:

Surname:
Constance Jenkins Macky (1883–1961), Australian-born American painter, educator.
Eric Spencer Macky (1880–1958), New Zealand-born American artist, educator
Frank Macky, Australian rules footballer
Graham Macky (born 1954), New Zealand long-distance runner
John Macky (died 1726), Scottish spy
Neil Lloyd Macky (1891–1981), New Zealand lawyer and military leader
Willow Macky (1921–2006), New Zealand songwriter

Given name:
Macky Escalona (born 1984), Filipino basketball player
Macky Makisumi (born 1990), Japanese speedcuber
Macky Sall (born 1961), Senegalese politician